The Tani people, are a Tibeto-Burmese ethnic group of people from the Indian states of Arunachal Pradesh, Assam, and the Tibet Autonomous Region of China which share common Tani languages and certain common beliefs, primarily in Abotani as their primeval ancestor (Father of Human). The group comprises Nyishi,  Adi, Apatani, Galo, Tagin, and Mising. They are also often referred to as the Tani group.

With a population of 1.7 million, the Tani are one of the largest ethnic groups in North Eastern India.

The Tani are scattered across larger regions of Arunachal Pradesh except Tirap, Changlang, Longding, West Kameng, and Tawang. The major part of the Mising tribe is scattered in the different district of Upper Assam. Thousands of Tani populace are also found across the border in Tibet Autonomous Region, China. The Chinese government recognise Tani as members of the Lhoba people.

History
Most of the residents of Arunachal Pradesh belongs to the five Tani tribes (Nyishi, Adi, Galo, Apatani, and Tagin) supposedly descended from Abotani. The history of the Tani people is found in the ancient libraries of Tibet as the Tani people traded swords and other metals to Tibetans in exchange for meat and wool. Tibetans referred to the Tani people as the Lhobhas; lho means south and bha means people.

Notable people
Bakin Pertin (1st elected MP, 1977-79)
Lalit Kumar Doley (1st elected MP, 1977-80)
Gora Pertin (1st Speaker)
Jomin Tayeng (1st IAS)
Jatin Mipun (1st IPS, 1983 Batch- Ex-Director Fire & Emergency Services, Govt of Assam)
Mamuk Lego (Roing Founder)
Mrinal Miri (Educationalist, Padma Bhusan awardee, Nominated Rajya Sabha member)
Indira Miri (Educationist, Padma Shri awardee)
Mahi Chandra Miri(Assam's first chief conservator of forest)
Tabu Taid (Indian educationist, linguist)
James Onyok Tayeng (1st inducted IAS)
Tapi Mra (1st Everest Climber)
Jadav Payeng (environmentalist; part of the Mising ethnic group)
Shakuntala Doley Gamlin (1st Women IAS, 1984 Batch-AGMUT Cadre)
 Dyuti Rani Doley Barman (1st Women IPS of Assam, 1986 Batch- Retired Director SVP National Police Academy)

References

Scheduled Tribes of India